Eastern University may refer to:
Eastern University (Bangladesh) in Dhaka, Bangladesh
Eastern University (United States) in St. David's, Pennsylvania, USA
Eastern University of Sri Lanka in Batticaloa, Sri Lanka
Universidad del Este (Puerto Rico), Eastern University 

Eastern University may also refer to:
Eastern Connecticut State University in Willimantic, Connecticut
Eastern Illinois University in Charleston, Illinois
Eastern Kentucky University in Richmond, Kentucky
Eastern Mennonite University in Harrisonburg, Virginia
Eastern Michigan University in Ypsilanti, Michigan
Eastern New Mexico University in Portales, New Mexico
Eastern Oregon University in La Grande, Oregon
Eastern Washington University in Cheney, Washington
University of Texas at Tyler, formerly Texas Eastern University, in Tyler, Texas
Eastern Mediterranean University in Famagusta, Cyprus
Naples Eastern University in Naples, Italy
Eastern Samar State University in Borongan, Eastern Samar, Philippines
Far Eastern University in Manila, Philippines
Far Eastern National University in Vladivostok, Russia
Far Eastern State University, the English-translated name until 2000 of the present Far Eastern National University in Vladivostok, Russia

See also
Eastern College (disambiguation)